Sergei Ratnikov (born 21 November 1959) is an Estonian professional football manager and former player. He last managed Levadia in Estonian Meistriliiga.

Personal
Two of Ratnikov's sons, Eduard Ratnikov and Daniil Ratnikov, are footballers.

International career
Ratnikov played for the Estonia national football team during the 1990s. He earned his first official cap on June 3, 1992, when Estonia met Slovenia in a friendly.

Club career
He has played for clubs like FC Flora Tallinn, FC Nikol Tallinn, and in Finland for VIFK Vaasa and FF Jaro.

References

1959 births
Living people
Sportspeople from Pärnu
Estonian footballers
Estonia international footballers
Estonian people of Russian descent
Association football midfielders
Estonian football managers
JK Tallinna Kalev managers
FC Flora players
FC Nikol Tallinn players
Estonian expatriate footballers
Estonian expatriate sportspeople in Finland
Expatriate footballers in Finland
FF Jaro players
JK Narva Trans managers